Amata Grassi (born Anna Beatrice Koch June 1, 1894 New York - ) was an American classical dancer, and swimmer.

Life 
Beginning in 1917, she danced with Anna Pavlova. In 1920, she performed in Little Miss Charity. She danced with Adolph Bolm Ballet Intime, and the Chicago Opera Company. She was company manager of a USO company with Major Bowes. She was married to Chester Hale from September 1918 to May 1931. She was remarried, to Walter Hussen.

References

External links 

1970 deaths
1894 births
20th-century American dancers